In the Rain is the eighth studio album by the English band Sol Invictus, released in 1995 by the record label Tursa. On this recording, Sol Invictus wed trumpet, violin and cello to folk arrangements. Lyrically, the album  focuses on the fragility of life and the certainty of death.

Recording and production
In the Rain was the first Sol Invictus album to fully incorporate classical instrumentation. It was the last on which the musicians David Mellor and Sarah Bradshaw participated.

The frontman Tony Wakeford has described it as his most personal album. According to the book Looking for Europe: Neofolk und Hintergründe, the song "An English Garden" appears to be inspired by the film The Innocents, based on the novel The Turn of the Screw by Henry James. The album liner notes include drawings by Tor Lundvall.

Reception
John Bush of AllMusic described In the Rain as "a good collection of pop songs" but criticised Wakeford's vocals for being "occasionally erratic". The music scholar Isabella van Elferen analyzed the track "An English Garden" in 2013. She used its lyrics as an example of the nostalgia and sense of "not-belonging" present in goth music, and wrote that the instrumentation, song structure and chords evoke the "idealised British home of Goth", which becomes "musically disclosed as the locus of nothing less than the uncanny itself". The French music critic  wrote in 2016 that the album significantly changed the genre of neofolk, because it added cello, violin, piano and trumpet to the acoustic guitar and vocals, creating a new formula based on "slick production and the simple but effective beauty of the melodies". Cesare Buttaboni and Marco De Baptistis of  call it "undoubtedly Sol Invictus' masterpiece up to that point", highlighting the album's relatively varied vocals, the absence of filler tracks and how the lyrics attribute spiritual value to everyday details, which creates a message that is pessimistic but open to hope.

Track listing

Personnel
Tony Wakeford — Guitars, vocals
Sarah Bradshaw — Cello
David Mellor — Piano, keyboards
Karl Blake — Electric guitar & bass
Nathalie Van Keymeulen — Violin
Céline Marleix-Bardeau — Violin
Eric Rodgers — Trumpet
Nick Hall — Drums, percussion

References

Citations

Sources

 
 
 
 
 

Sol Invictus (band) albums
1995 albums